Tarby's Frame Game was a British game show that aired on ITV from 24 May 1987 to 29 July 1989 and hosted by Jimmy Tarbuck. It was based on a 1984 unsold pilot in the US called It, produced by Bernstein-Hovis productions, and hosted by Gene Rayburn

Premise
Two teams of couples try to solve a series of three-word puzzles called frames. A frame is two words with a linking word missing in between. The object of the game is to guess a word that is the missing link between the two words.

Example: LITTLE-<<BLANK>>-SIMMONS Answer: "Richard" - LITTLE-RICHARD-SIMMONS

Gameplay
In each round, the couples were shown up to three frames each worth a decreasing number of points. The first was worth 30 points, the second was worth 20 points, and the last was worth 10 points. As soon as a couple knows the word they can buzz-in, if they're right, they score the points attached to the frame, if they're wrong or if nobody knows however, another frame with the same missing link was shown. An unlimited number of frames were played according to time.

The losing couples went away with a portable colour television.

Two new couples competed in the first two rounds with the winners of each round playing the super final round for the right to play the bonus round for big prizes.

In series 2 the format was changed where 3 couples competed in 2 rounds instead of the 2 heats and at the end of the 2 rounds the couple with the lowest score was eliminated while the 2 remaining couples played each other for the right to play for the big prizes.

Final Round
In the final round, while one member of the winning couple was isolated, the other was shown five middle words, and constructed a frame for each word by giving two connecting words before & after each word. When the giving player was finished, the guessing player returned and had 45 seconds within which to complete the frames. Solving all five won a grand prize, but failure won an increasing consolation prize.

Transmissions

External links

1987 British television series debuts
1989 British television series endings
1980s British game shows
English-language television shows
ITV game shows
Television series by ITV Studios
Television series by Sony Pictures Television
Television series by Yorkshire Television